The Lady Marjorie Helen Sybil Bellamy (nee Talbot-Carey; 6 May 1860 or 12 July 1864 – 15 April 1912) is a fictional character in the ITV drama Upstairs, Downstairs. She was portrayed by Rachel Gurney.

Early life
Lady Marjorie was born on 6 May 1860, or 12 July 1864, at Southwold, Wiltshire in the home of her wealthy parents, Walter Talbot-Carey, 12th Earl of Southwold and Mabel, the Countess of Southwold. She has one brother, Hugo, Viscount Ashby, who later becomes 13th Earl of Southwold. She also has a paternal aunt and uncle and cousin, who succeed Hugo as Earl of Southwold.

Inconsistency of dates 
The episode "A Family Gathering" has the Bellamys celebrating Lady Marjorie's birthday on the same day as The King died, 6 May. In the episode "Desirous of Change", however, her birthday is said to be 12 July.

Marriage and children
Despite parental objections, she marries the younger son of a country parson, Richard Bellamy in 1880 and they live rent free in London's fashionable Belgravia in a grand Victorian townhouse which Lady Marjorie's father owns. They have two children, James (born 1881) and Elizabeth (born 1887). Shortly before their marriage, Richard became a Conservative MP with the help of her father.

Lady Marjorie is portrayed as elegant and having something of the hauteur of women of her age and class but also as basically kind. She maintains social and class distinctions at all times and, unlike her upright husband, is less concerned about absolute moral values than appearances.

In the summer of 1906, she has an affair with a much younger man, Charles Victor Hammond, a Captain in the Khyber Rifles and a friend of her son. He asks her to run off with him but she refuses as she realises her duty to her family. 

In a later episode, a man (Mr.Dooley) who had been Hammond's military batman (personal attendant) shows up with a packet of love letters she had written to him. In a sting attempt by the chauffeur, who is given the letters for the purpose of negotiating with Lady Marjorie, monies are extorted from both Bellamys, each unknown to the other, with the convoluted result that ends with Mr. Dooley in jail (on an unrelated charge) and all monies restored to the individuals, with Thomas receiving a gratuity from each of the Bellamys.

Death
On 15 April 1912, Lady Marjorie and her lady's maid, Miss Roberts, along with Lady Marjorie's brother, the new Lord Southwold, and his new wife are passengers on the ill-fated maiden voyage of the RMS Titanic. They are both presumed dead, but Roberts survived and later informs the family that Lady Marjorie had at first refused to go out on deck as it was too cold. When ordered to the ship's crew, Lady Marjorie and Roberts found a little girl on deck crying she had lost her mother. Lady Marjorie pressed her jewel case into Roberts' hands, saying "Keep this safe for me, Roberts"; and took the little girl's hand, saying she would help her find her mother. This was the last time Roberts saw her Ladyship. 

Upstairs, Downstairs characters